Micah McLaurin is an American pianist.

Biography 

Born in Charleston, SC,  Micah began playing piano at the age of eight, when his grandmother gave his family her old piano. He started lessons with Marsha Gerber, and later continued studying in Charleston with Enrique Graf. At 18, he was accepted into the Curtis Institute of Music, where he received his bachelor's degree in 2018, studying with Robert McDonald and Gary Graffman. He then completed his master's degree at the Juilliard School with Jerome Lowenthal and Yoheved Kaplinksy.

He was a winner of the 2016 Gilmore Young Artist Award, an award given every two years to the two most promising pianists in the country, age 22 and younger. As part of the prize, he commissioned Stephen Hough to write his “Piano Sonata No.4”, which at Micah's request, quotes Charles Trenet's “En Avril a Paris”. He has also won top prizes in the Ettlingen International Competition, the Thomas and Evon Cooper International Competition, the 2011 Hilton Head International Piano Competition, and the Verbier Festival Tabor Prize.

In 2018, Micah made his Philadelphia Orchestra debut, performing Bernstein's Age of Anxiety as part of the Bernstein Centennial Celebration concert. He performed again with the Philadelphia Orchestra that year, playing Gershwin's Concerto in F at the Mann Center. He has also performed with the Cleveland Orchestra, Charleston Symphony, North Carolina Symphony, Virginia Symphony, and with orchestras in Montevideo, El Salvador, and Italy. He was engaged to debut with the Spoleto Festival Orchestra in 2020, but the concert was canceled due to COVID-19.

Micah made his Lincoln Center recital debut at Alice Tully Hall in 2019, presented by the Musicians Emergency Fund. He also gave a guest performance at the 2019 Youth America Grand Prix Gala at David Koch Theater. As a recitalist, he has performed in The Miami International Piano Festival, the Verbier Festival, the Aspen Music Festival, La Societa dei Concerti di Milano, The Gilmore Keyboard Festival, Piccolo Spoleto Festival, Jeudis du Piano in Geneve, Les Pianissimes in Paris, The Raleigh Paderewski Festival, the Chopin Foundation of Miami, Music Fest Perugia, and others.

Among his collaborators are conductors and musicians Joann Falletta, Joshua Weilerstein, Jahja Ling, Nicholas McGegan, Ken Lam, Orli Shaham, and Anthony Roth Costanzo.

Micah has released two recordings - an album of live performances titled “Micah McLaurin Live” in 2020, and in 2021 released his studio album “Chopin”.

He has appeared in media publications such as WWD, Paper Magazine, Resident Magazine, Pluton Magazine, and others.

References

External links
Official Website
Paper - Coolest Person in the Room by Megan Walschlager

1994 births
American classical pianists
Male classical pianists
American male pianists
Living people
People from Charleston, South Carolina
20th-century American pianists
21st-century classical pianists
20th-century American male musicians
21st-century American male musicians
21st-century American pianists